The Raccoon River is a  tributary of the Des Moines River in central Iowa in the United States. Via the Des Moines River, it is part of the watershed of the Mississippi River. The river runs through an intensely cultivated area of croplands and livestock farming, receiving Tile drainage from slow-draining rich natural bottomland.

The Des Moines metropolitan area has been obtaining its drinking water from the Raccoon River just before it empties into the Des Moines River through water utilities since the 19th century. During the Great Flood of 1993, the Raccoon River flooded the water treatment facility of Des Moines, shutting off the city's supply of drinking water.

History

The Racoon River was first documented on the 1814 map by Lewis and Clark, though the USGS references the name to a later map from 1843 named Hydrological Basin of the Upper Mississippi River based on field measurements by Joseph N. Nicollet during his Midwestern expeditions in the 1830s.

Course
The Raccoon River is a  tributary of the Des Moines River in central Iowa in the United States.

The river runs through an intensely cultivated area of croplands mostly of corn and soy and livestock farming, where slow-draining rich natural bottomlands have been tiled to drain them for agricultural cultivation.

It rises north of Marathon in northeastern Buena Vista County and initially flows southwardly into Sac County, where it turns southeastward for the remainder of its course through Calhoun, Carroll, Greene and Dallas counties. It passes the towns of Sac City, Jefferson, Perry and Adel. The Adel Island dam in Adel is the only dam along its course.
The three dams located along its course are the Lake Panorama dam and the Lennon Mill dam at Panora, and the Redfield dam at Redfield. Even though the Lake Panorama dam, completed in 1970, was built for recreational purposes only, it has provided some additional benefits by controlling flooding along the Middle Raccoon River.
South of Redfield, after the Middle Raccoon River flows into the South Raccoon River, a flow gauge operated jointly by the United States Army Corps of Engineers (Rock Island District), the United States Geological Survey (Iowa District), and the Iowa Department of Transportation provides data about potential flooding threats.

The north and south forks join in Dallas County just west of Van Meter, and the Raccoon River flows generally eastward into Polk County, past Walnut Woods State Park and West Des Moines. It joins the Des Moines River just south of downtown Des Moines and is part of the watershed of the Mississippi River.

Drinking water use
Both the Raccoon and Des Moines rivers have been providing drinking water for the Des Moines metropolitan area through water utilities since the 19th century. During the Great Flood of 1993, the Raccoon River flooded the water treatment facility of Des Moines, shutting off the city's drinking water supply.

Agricultural pollution
Spring thaws, as in the spring of 2013, and rainy spells after drought wash nitrate from fertilizer into the river. On November 20, 2014 nitrates spiked at 13.7 parts per million (ppm), making the water unsafe for pregnant women and infants. (The US Environmental Protection Agency requires officials to inform the public about safety risks at 10 ppm.) At the time, these were the highest readings in the nation.

See also
List of Iowa rivers

References

Sources
Columbia Gazetteer of North America entry
DeLorme (1998).  Iowa Atlas & Gazetteer.  Yarmouth, Maine: DeLorme.  .

External links
Map of Raccoon River basin - Iowa Department of Natural Resources (DNR) website
South Raccoon River gage near Redfield - US Army Corps of Engineers website
North Raccoon River at Perry - National Oceanic Atmospheric Administration (NOAA) website
Middle Raccoon River at Panora - NOAA website
South Raccoon River at Redfield - NOAA website
Raccoon River at Van Meter - NOAA website
Raccoon River at Des Moines Fleur Drive - NOAA website

Rivers of Iowa
Tributaries of the Des Moines River
Geography of Des Moines, Iowa
Rivers of Sac County, Iowa
Rivers of Calhoun County, Iowa
Rivers of Carroll County, Iowa
Rivers of Greene County, Iowa
Rivers of Dallas County, Iowa
Rivers of Polk County, Iowa
Rivers of Audubon County, Iowa
Rivers of Guthrie County, Iowa